This season is the first season of HGTV Design Star. It features 10 designers competing for their own show on HGTV.

Designers

The winning Design Star was David Bromstad, who went on to host Color Splash. David and Alice each also won a brand new Mercury Mariner.
1 Age at the time of the show's filming

Contestant progress

 The designer won America's vote and the competition.
 The designer lost America's vote and received second place.
 The designer advanced to the finale.
 The designer was selected as the winner of the episode's Elimination Challenge.
 The designer was selected as one of the top entries in the Elimination Challenge, but did not win.
 The designer was not selected as either top entry or bottom entry in the Elimination Challenge, and advanced to the next challenge.
 The designer was selected as one of the bottom entries in the Elimination Challenge, but was not deemed the worst of the designers who advanced in that particular week.
 The designer was selected as one of the bottom two entries in the Elimination Challenge, and was deemed the worst of the designers who advanced in that particular week.
 The designer was eliminated from the competition.
 The designer was eliminated outside the panel from the competition.
1 In the fourth episode, the designer with the worst design in the clients' eyes would be eliminated outside of the judging panel. The worst design was Teran's, and so he was cut.  The design deemed best was Temple's.

Episodes
 "Design a New York City Townhouse"
 "Designing to Sell"
 "'Wild Card' Design"
 $10,000 Kitchen Makeover"
 "Designing with Color"
 "Create a Dream Room"
 "Glass Houses"
 "Finale"

References

2006 American television seasons